The Major League Soccer Player Combine used to be a four-day annual showcase, occurring every January. For 2020 it will not happen. It seems that individual teams will be doing their own trials instead.

Format 
The present Player Combine features four teams composed of invitees, usually who play on youth national teams or were standout players on premier college soccer teams.

2018 Combine Teams 
 Team Tango (blue)
 Team Predator (red)
 Team X (white)
 Team Nemeziz (black)

Caribbean expansion

In November 2013, the Caribbean Football Union and Major League Soccer came to an agreement where all 31 CFU members could put forward player candidates between the age of 18 and 22 to be entered into the combine. The Caribbean candidates would be vetted at a Caribbean combine event taking place in Antigua in January 2014.

See also 
 MLS SuperDraft
 MLS Supplemental Draft
 College soccer

References

External links
 Official website

Combine
Sports in Fort Lauderdale, Florida
Soccer in Florida